George Tomlinson (12 March 1794 – 6 February 1863) was an English cleric, the Anglican Bishop of Gibraltar from 1842 to 1863.

Biography

Tomlinson was born in Lancashire, the son of John Tomlinson. He was first educated at St Saviour's Grammar School, Southwark, and entered St John's College, Cambridge, in 1818, matriculating in 1819. He graduated B.A. in 1823, M.A. in 1826, and D.D. in 1842. He was founder of the Cambridge Apostles.

Ordained in 1822, Tomlinson became chaplain to William Howley, the Bishop of London, and was employed as a tutor by Sir Robert Peel. In 1825 he became secretary to the City of London Infant School Society, a High Church alternative around Howley, Peel and Charles James Blomfield to the Infant School Society of Samuel Wilderspin.

From 1831 to 1842, Tomlinson was secretary to the SPCK. There he wrote for the Saturday Magazine, and founded the Clergy List and Ecclesiastical Gazette. In 1840 he undertook an ecumenical mission in the Levant, and wrote a report on it.

On 24 August 1842, Tomlinson was consecrated a bishop at Westminster Abbey. He died there on 9 February 1863, aged 68.

Family
Tomlinson married twice. His first wife was Louisa, daughter of Gen. Sir Patrick Stuart; they were married in 1848, and she died in 1850. His second wife was Eleanor Jane, daughter of Colonel Charles Mackenzie Fraser, 10th Laird of Inverallochy and 6th of Castle Fraser; they were married in 1855.

References

External links
WorldCat page

Alumni of St John's College, Cambridge
19th-century Anglican bishops of Gibraltar
People educated at St Saviour's Grammar School
1794 births
1863 deaths